Charles E. Welner (September 3, 1935 – December 25, 2017) was an American college football coach. He was the head coach of Maranatha Baptist Bible College in Watertown, Wisconsin, from 1979 to 1983, compiling a record of 5–32.

Welner served as a high school coach in a variety of locations during his career. Most notably, he was coach for three Maine state high school football championships at York High School from 1963 to 1965.

Head coaching record

College

References

1935 births
2017 deaths
Maranatha Baptist Bible Sabercats football coaches
University of New Hampshire alumni
People from Topsham, Maine
Coaches of American football from Maine